Wood & Stock: Sexo, Orégano e Rock'n'Roll (original title ) is a Brazilian adult animated film about two die-hard hippies trying to live in today's world. The film, based on the comic strip by Angeli, was released in 2006. The voice of the character Rê Bordosa is provided by Rita Lee, ex vocalist of the famous Brazilian psychedelic band Os Mutantes.

External links 
 
 
 Trailer

2006 films
2006 animated films
Brazilian animated films
Animated comedy films
Hippie films
2000s Portuguese-language films
Films based on Brazilian comics
Animated films based on comics
Films directed by Otto Guerra
2006 comedy films
Brazilian comedy films